The 2013–14 Tennessee State Tigers basketball team represented Tennessee State University during the 2013–14 NCAA Division I men's basketball season. The Tigers, led by second year head coach Travis Williams, played their home games at the Gentry Complex and were members of the East Division of the Ohio Valley Conference. They finished the season 5–25, 4–12 in OVC play to finish in a tie for fifth place in the East Division. They failed to qualify for the Ohio Valley Tournament.

At the end of the season, head coach Travis Williams was fired after only two seasons and a record of 23–40.

Roster

Schedule

|-
!colspan=9 style="background:#0000FF; color:#FFFFFF;"| Exhibition

|-
!colspan=9 style="background:#0000FF; color:#FFFFFF;"| Regular Season

References

Tennessee State Tigers basketball seasons
Tennessee State
Tennessee State Tigers basketball
Tennessee State Tigers basketball